This is a list of main career statistics of former South African professional tennis player Kevin Anderson. All statistics are according to the ATP World Tour and ITF websites.

Performance timeline

Only main-draw results in ATP Tour, Grand Slam tournaments, Davis Cup/ATP Cup/Laver Cup and Olympic Games are included in win–loss records.

Singles

Doubles

Grand Slam finals

Singles: 2 (2 runner-ups)

ATP career finals

Singles: 20 (7 titles, 13 runner-ups)

Doubles: 4 (1 title, 3 runner-ups)

ATP Challenger and ITF Futures finals

Singles: 16 (6–10)

Doubles: 10 (8–2)

Record against top-10 players
Anderson's match record against players who have been ranked in the top 10, with those who are active in boldface. Only ATP Tour main draw matches are considered.

|-bgcolor=efefef class="sortbottom"
|align=left colspan=9|Number 1 ranked players

 

|-bgcolor=efefef class="sortbottom"
|align=left colspan=9|Number 2 ranked players

|-bgcolor=efefef class="sortbottom"
|align=left colspan=9|Number 3 ranked players

|-bgcolor=efefef class="sortbottom"
|align=left colspan=9|Number 4 ranked players

|-bgcolor=efefef class="sortbottom"
|align=left colspan=9|Number 5 ranked players

|-bgcolor=efefef class="sortbottom"
|align=left colspan=9|Number 6 ranked players

 

|-bgcolor=efefef class="sortbottom"
|align=left colspan=9|Number 7 ranked players

|-bgcolor=efefef class="sortbottom"
|align=left colspan=9|Number 8 ranked players

|-bgcolor=efefef class="sortbottom"
|align=left colspan=9|Number 9 ranked players

|-bgcolor=efefef class="sortbottom"
|align=left colspan=9|Number 10 ranked players

Wins over top 10 players
He has a  record against players who were, at the time the match was played, ranked in the top 10.

Year End Rankings

Notes

References

External links

Official website

Profiles
 
 
 
 Kevin Anderson at the Illinois Fighting Illini
Anderson, Kevin